The 2012–13 Cuban National Series was the 52nd season of the league. Villa Clara won the Series' playoff final, over Matanzas.

References

Cuban National Series seasons
Cuban National Series
Cuban National Series
2012 in Cuban sport